The Palma Arena (also known in Spanish as Velodrome Palma) is a multisport pavilion of the city of Palma. Its construction involved major cost overruns, and massive corruption.

Its main function is hosting indoor track cycling races on a banked track, and it is one of the best equipped in Europe for this purpose. It was constructed under the auspices of Dutch architectural firm Sander Douma which specializes in indoor cycling venues, and was inaugurated in 2007 when it hosted the 2007 UCI Track Cycling World Championships. It has a capacity of 6,607 spectators.

On May 2, 2007 it staged the 'Battle of Surfaces' tennis match which saw Mallorca local and World No. 2 Rafael Nadal take on World No. 1 Roger Federer. This match was unique because one side of the court was clay - Nadal's speciality - and the other side was grass - Federer's speciality. The result was a push for Federer as he won equal points on both surfaces, but Nadal used the clay to his advantage in victory capturing 12 more points than he did on grass.

See also
 List of tennis stadiums by capacity

References

Velodromes in Spain
Indoor arenas in Spain
Sport in Mallorca
Buildings and structures in Palma de Mallorca
Sports venues in the Balearic Islands
2007 establishments in Spain
Sports venues completed in 2007
Tennis venues in Spain